Umbartha (IPA: Umbaraṭhā) is a 1982 Indian Marathi-language film produced by D. V. Rao and directed and coproduced by Jabbar Patel. The film is a story of a woman's dream to step outside her four walled home and bring change in the society. Smita Patil played the lead protagonist in the film for which she won Marathi Rajya Chitrapat Puraskar for Best Actress. The film was adjudged as the Best Feature Film in Marathi at the 29th National Film Awards for "a sincere cinematic statement on the theme of a woman seeking to establish her identity by pursuing a career, even at the risk of alienation from her family".

The film is based on a Marathi novel Beghar by Shanta Nisal and was also simultaneously made in Hindi as Subah with the same cast.

Plot
Sulabha Mahajan is a woman who dreams to step out of the four walls of the house, assume greater responsibility as a citizen and play an important role in shaping the society. She has passion to do something constructive for the abused, assaulted, neglected and traumatized womenfolk of the society she lives in. She gets a job offer as Superintendent of a Women's Reformatory Home in a remote town of Sangamwadi. The job offer raises objections from her lawyer husband Subhash and conservative mother-in-law who refuse to understand her need to move to the town and work for rehabilitation of the women. But her sister-in-law supports her by offering help in looking after her young daughter Rani. Determined Sulabha then goes ahead with her dream job.

She meets various challenges in her new endeavor. She starts with bringing discipline in the Home and also discovers frauds that take place there. But she is not helped by the managing committee which is filled with selfish and careless people. She hence decides to take steps against their sanction. She starts some classes to educate willing women and also marries off one of the inmates in order to give a new start to her life. She discovers how a local MLA Bane has been regularly using the inmates of the home to satisfy his sexual needs. Two of the inmates decide to run away but are forcefully brought back to the home. They both commit suicide by burning themselves. Sulabha is then questioned by committee and newspapers for her improper control on the home. An administrative enquiry is set up against her. It is then that she decides to resign and give up all her work and return home.

When she returns to her home she is happily welcomed by her sister-in-law but not so much by her daughter and mother-in-law. She then discovers that her husband Subhash has been involved with another woman in her absence. His betrayal changes her mind and she again sets off to follow her dream work.

Cast
 Smita Patil as Sulabha Mahajan
 Girish Karnad as Advocate Subhash Mahajan
 Shrikant Moghe as Dr. Mohan Mahajan (Subhash's elder brother)
 Ashalata Wabgaonkar as Maya Mahajan (Mohan's wife)
 Kusum Kulkarni as Mrs. Mahajan (Sulabha's mother-in-law)
 Pournima Ganu (Manohar) as Rani
 Radha Karnad as young Rani
 Satish Alekar as Walimbe (principal)
 Mukund Chitale as Gate-man
 Surekha Divakar as Farida
 Daya Dongre as Chairman Sheela Samson
 Ravi Patwardhan as MLA Bane
 Vijay Joshi as Peon
 Jayamala Kale as Sugandha
 Sandhya Kale as Heera, Clerk / Typist
 Swaroopa Khopkar  as Utpala Joshi
 Manorama Wagle as Kamalabai

Soundtrack
The soundtrack of the film is composed by Hridaynath Mangeshkar on lyrics written by Vasant Bapat and Suresh Bhat. All songs are sung by Lata Mangeshkar, except "Ganjalya Othas Majhya"  which is sung by Ravindra Sathe.

Awards
 1982 – National Film Award for Best Feature Film in Marathi
 1982 – Maharashtra State Film Awards – Best Film
 1982 – Maharashtra State Film Awards – Best Director – Jabbar Patel
 1982 – Maharashtra State Film Awards – Best Actress – Smita Patil

References

External links
 

Films about women in India
Indian LGBT-related films
Lesbian-related films
Women in prison films
Indian prison films
Films with screenplays by Vijay Tendulkar
Best Marathi Feature Film National Film Award winners
1980s Marathi-language films
Films based on Indian novels
Films directed by Jabbar Patel